Highball is a 1997 unfinished film directed by Noah Baumbach, co-written by Baumbach, Carlos Jacott, and Christopher Reed. The film is credited as having been directed by Ernie Fusco and written by Jesse Carter after being disowned by Baumbach. The film was shot over 6 days with remaining money from Baumbach's previous film Mr. Jealousy.

Plot

A newly married couple decides to improve their social life by throwing three great parties and inviting tons of people at their Brooklyn apartment. The film follows this pursuit over the course of a year.

Friends' (Justine Bateman, Peter Bogdanovich, Dean Cameron) relationships are tested during a birthday party, a Halloween party and a New Year's Eve party.

Cast

Removal of credit
Baumbach has removed his credit for the film, explaining in an interview with The A.V. Club:

References

External links
 
 
 
 

1997 films
1997 comedy-drama films
1997 independent films
American comedy-drama films
American independent films
Films about parties
Films directed by Noah Baumbach
Films set in Brooklyn
Films shot in New York City
1990s English-language films
1990s American films